The Concha Formation is a geologic formation in Texas and Arizona. It preserves fossils dating back to the Permian period.

See also

 List of fossiliferous stratigraphic units in Texas
 Paleontology in Texas

References
 

Permian Arizona
Permian geology of Texas